Helen Schifano (13 April 1922 – 9 November 2007) was an American gymnast who competed in the 1948 Summer Olympics.

References

1922 births
2007 deaths
American gymnasts
Gymnasts at the 1948 Summer Olympics
Olympic bronze medalists for the United States in gymnastics
Medalists at the 1948 Summer Olympics